is a Japanese track and road cyclist, who last rode for UCI Continental team . He won the silver medal in the team pursuit at the 2016 Asian Cycling Championships.
He is a Keirin racer since 2022.

Major results

Track

2014
 3rd  Team pursuit, Asian Games
2015
 Asian Championships
2nd  Team pursuit
3rd  Individual pursuit
2016
 1st  Individual pursuit, National Championships
 2nd  Team pursuit, Asian Championships
2017
 National Championships
1st  Individual pursuit
1st  Madison
 UCI World Cup
2nd Team pursuit, Santiago
 2nd  Team pursuit, Asian Championships
2018
 Asian Championships
1st  Individual pursuit 
1st  Team pursuit (with Shunsuke Imamura, Shogo Ichimaru & Keitaro Sawada)
 National Championships
1st  Team pursuit
1st  Madison
2nd Individual pursuit
 Asian Games
2nd  Individual pursuit
3rd  Team pursuit
2019
 National Championships
1st  Team pursuit
2nd Madison
2nd Individual pursuit
3rd Points race
 2nd  Team pursuit, Asian Championships
2020
 1st  Team pursuit, Asian Championships (with Kazushige Kuboki, Shunsuke Imamura, Keitaro Sawada & Eiya Hashimoto)
 1st  Team pursuit, National Championships

Road
2018
 2nd Time trial, National Road Championships

References

External links

1992 births
Living people
Japanese track cyclists
Japanese male cyclists
Cyclists at the 2014 Asian Games
Cyclists at the 2018 Asian Games
Asian Games medalists in cycling
Medalists at the 2014 Asian Games
Medalists at the 2018 Asian Games
Asian Games silver medalists for Japan
Asian Games bronze medalists for Japan